Comorta is a genus of moths of the family Pyralidae.

Species
Comorta plinthina (Turner, 1905)
Comorta zophopleura (Turner, 1904)

References

Anerastiini
Pyralidae genera